Green River Plantation is a historic plantation house on over 360 acres located near Columbus, Polk County, North Carolina. The oldest section of the "Big House" was built between the years 1804–1807, and is a two-story, four bay, Late Federal style frame dwelling. A later two-story, four bay, brick Greek Revival style dwelling was built beside the original structure in the mid-19th century. The two sections were joined in the late 19th century by a two-story section and grand staircase to form a structure that is over 10,000 square feet in size and boasts over 42 rooms and spaces. The plantation house was built by Joseph McDowell Carson, son of Col. John Carson, who built Carson House at Marion, North Carolina. The later-built section of the home was the residence of Samuel Price Carson, North Carolina State Senator and U.S. Federal Representative, and younger brother of Joseph McDowell Carson.

Green River Plantation was added to the National Register of Historic Places in 1974. The plantation house and surrounding grounds are a private residence but are open for historic tours with reservation. The grounds and facilities can also be reserved for events such as weddings, receptions, luncheons, concerts, corporate events, and reunions.

References 

Plantation houses in North Carolina
Houses on the National Register of Historic Places in North Carolina
Federal architecture in North Carolina
Greek Revival houses in North Carolina
Gothic Revival architecture in North Carolina
Houses completed in 1807
Houses in Polk County, North Carolina
National Register of Historic Places in Polk County, North Carolina